The Greeneville Astros were a Minor League Baseball team that played in the Rookie-level Appalachian League from 2004 to 2017. They represented the town of Greeneville, Tennessee, though Pioneer Park, their home stadium, was located in nearby Tusculum on the campus of Tusculum College. They were named for their Major League Baseball affiliate, the Houston Astros.

Over 14 years of competition, the Astros played in 938 regular season games and compiled a 440–498 win–loss record. They qualified for the postseason on four occasions and won the Appalachian League championship in 2004 and 2015. They had a postseason record of 9–8. Combining all 955 regular season and postseason games, the Astros had an all-time record of 449–506.

Among the players to come through Greeneville before playing in Major League Baseball are José Altuve, Carlos Correa, Mike Foltynewicz, and J. D. Martinez.

History
Professional baseball was first played in Greeneville, Tennessee, by the Greeneville Burley Cubs in the Appalachian League in 1921. They remained in the league through 1925 and returned for a second stretch from 1938 to 1942. Prior to the 2004 season, the Houston Astros moved their Rookie Appalachian League affiliate from Martinsville, Virginia, where they were known as the Martinsville Astros, to Greeneville as the Greeneville Astros. While the team bore the name of Greeneville, they would play their home games at Pioneer Park located in nearby Tusculum on the campus of Tusculum College.

Managed by Tim Bogar, the Astros played their first game on June 21, 2004, on the road against the Elizabethton Twins at Joe O'Brien Field, winning 3–1. They completed their inaugural season with a first place 41–26 record, the all-time franchise highest. Having won the Western Division title, Greeneville then defeated the Danville Braves, 2–1, in a best-of-three series to win the Appalachian League championship. Bogar was selected for the league's Manager of the Year Award, and outfielder Mitch Einertson won Player of the Year honors.

The Astros missed the playoffs for the next eight seasons, often finishing fourth or fifth out of five teams in the Western Division. The 2007 team set a franchise record low win–loss record with a 17–51 season.

Led by Manager of the Year Josh Bonifay, the 2013 Astros earned a playoff spot with a 38–30 second place finish. They won their semifinal match-up versus the Kingsport Mets, 2–1, but lost in the finals to the Pulaski Mariners, 2–0. Another second place finish at 34–33 under Lamarr Rogers in 2015 brought Greenville back to the postseason. They defeated Kingsport in the semifinals, 2–1, then won their second Appalachian League championship with a 2–1 series win over the Princeton Rays. In 2017, the Astros again finished second (33–34) to earn a playoff spot under manager Danny Ortega. They were, however, eliminated by the Elizabethton Twins, 2–1, in the semifinals with a 6–0 shutout road loss on September 6.

The Houston Astros announced two days later that they were eliminating their Appalachian League team in Greeneville so as to strengthen their player development efforts by reducing their farm system from nine teams to eight. Over 14 years in Greenville, the Astros led the Appalachian League in total and average attendance at Pioneer Park from 2004 to 2014. Their all-time regular season record was 440–498 (.469).

In 2018, the Cincinnati Reds took Greeneville's place in the Appalachian League with the Greeneville Reds.

Season-by-season results

Award winners and All-Stars

Notable players

Through the completion of the 2019 season, 53 Greenville Astros have also played in at least one game in Major League Baseball during their careers.

References

External links
 Statistics from Baseball-Reference

2004 establishments in Tennessee
2017 disestablishments in Tennessee
Baseball teams established in 2004
Baseball teams disestablished in 2017
Defunct Appalachian League teams
Defunct baseball teams in Tennessee
Greeneville, Tennessee
Houston Astros minor league affiliates
Professional baseball teams in Tennessee
Tusculum, Tennessee